Hugo Leonardo Pérez (born 6 October 1968, in Avellaneda) is a former Argentine football midfielder. He played for both of the Avellaneda giants; Racing Club and Club Atlético Independiente.

He also played club football for Ferro Carril Oeste and Estudiantes de La Plata in Argentina and Real Sporting de Gijón in Spain.

Pérez was part of the Argentina squad for the 1994 FIFA World Cup.

References

External links
 Argentine Primera statistics  
 

1968 births
Living people
Sportspeople from Avellaneda
Argentine footballers
Argentina international footballers
1994 FIFA World Cup players
1995 King Fahd Cup players
1995 Copa América players
Association football midfielders
Racing Club de Avellaneda footballers
Ferro Carril Oeste footballers
Club Atlético Independiente footballers
Argentine Primera División players
La Liga players
Sporting de Gijón players
Estudiantes de La Plata footballers
Argentine expatriate footballers
Argentine expatriate sportspeople in Spain
Expatriate footballers in Spain
Footballers at the 1988 Summer Olympics
Olympic footballers of Argentina